Fathabad (also Romanized as Fatḩābād) is a village in Lar Rural District, Laran District, Shahrekord County, Chaharmahal and Bakhtiari Province, Iran. At the 2006 census, its population was 228, in 61 families. The village is populated by Persians with a minority of Turkic peoples.

References 

Populated places in Shahr-e Kord County